Sutton upon Tern is a civil parish in Shropshire, England. Expanded in 1914 after the abolition of the parish Drayton in Hales, Its name in Old English means 'South farm/settlement' on the River Tern. It is situated south of Market Drayton, on the River Tern.

About

In the 2011 census it had a population of 1,232, the majority of them between the ages of 35–55. A description of Sutton upon Tern was written in the early 1870s:

"SUTTON, a township in Drayton-in-Hales parish, Salop; 1 mile SSW of Market-Drayton. Pop[ulation]., 177"

It is unusual in that a small area of the parish, at Ternhill, is almost an exclave of the parish (only a 5m wide strip of land joins it with the bulk of the parish).

Located north-west within the parish, is Service Family Accommodation for nearby Clive Barracks. The housing estates are not "behind the wire" and consist of two areas; Buntingsdale Park (mainly Officer's housing) and Buntingsdale Estate for other ranks. There is a local Primary School, Buntingsdale Primary School and pub nearby.

The parish also includes the hamlet of Woodseaves, in the east of the parish on the A529. Woodseaves is also the midpoint of the longest north–south axis of the UK. Other than a few houses there is a nearby public house, The Four Alls Inn, Garden centre and narrow gauge railway attraction.

Along the Western border of the parish runs the A41 that is built upon a Roman Road linking the fort of Mediolanum (Whitchurch) to Pennocrucium (Stretton, Staffordshire).

History

Tyrley (Tirley) Castle was located North-East in the parish alongside the present day A529. "The castle built after the conquest by the Pantulfs" is believed to date back to 1066 and later rebuilt in stone in the thirteenth-century. The castle succeeded by a newly built Manor house in the 1280s which fell into disrepair, with an eighteenth-century farmhouse built upon the site to this day.

Sutton upon Tern was mentioned in the 1086 Domesday book where it resided in a district called 'Wrockwardine' under the ownership of Roger of Courseulles who was recorded as Tenant-in-chief. Sutton upon Tern was recorded as having 1 mill and 12 households, containing 9 villagers, 7 ploughlands, 9 smallholders, 2 plough teams and 1 lord's plough teams.

Brownhill Wood and Salisbury Hill, located south of Market Drayton was the scene of the gathering of the Earl of Salisbury's troops before the Battle of Blore Heath in 1459 during the Wars of the Roses. An 18-hole golf course now occupies this site.

The first census entry for Sutton upon Tern was made in 1921 where it had a total population of 512. This figure began to grow and by 1961 the population had tripled in size to 1,622 people. This can be attributed to the introduction of the National Health Service in 1948 allowing widespread use of new antibiotics and the post-war National Food Policy. All contributing to the post war baby boom. The population total has since peaked and has been slowly declining as shown in the most recent census of 2011.

Places of interest

Buntingsdale Hall, an 18th-century grade II listed building is located in the parish.

Woodseaves Cutting is a deep cut on the Shropshire Union Canal, named after the nearby hamlet situated to the west of the canal. Completed in 1832 it is the longest cutting on any canal in Britain, it is about 2.7 km long and up to about 21.3m deep.

Tyrley Wharf, Built North of Woodseaves it served as a small dock above a system of 5 locks. In 1911 it was used to load milk churns to be taken from the Peatswood Estate to Cadbury's factory at Knighton.

Market Drayton Golf Club founded in 1906 is an 18-hole golf course.

See also
Listed buildings in Sutton upon Tern

References

External links

Villages in Shropshire
Civil parishes in Shropshire